Donna M. Barry (née Mann; August 30, 1947) is an American politician in the state of Iowa.

Barry was born in Harrison County, Iowa and attended the University of Northern Iowa. A Republican, she served in the Iowa House of Representatives from 1995 to 2001 (82nd district)

References

1947 births
Living people
People from Harrison County, Iowa
University of Northern Iowa alumni
Women state legislators in Iowa
Republican Party members of the Iowa House of Representatives
Farmers from Iowa
21st-century American women